Neokadsuranin is a chemical compound isolated from Kadsura induta that has in vitro antiviral effects.

See also
 Angustific acid
 Angustifodilactone

References

Antiviral drugs
Benzodioxoles
Phenol ethers
Oxygen heterocycles
Heterocyclic compounds with 5 rings